Metachanda crocozona is a moth species in the oecophorine tribe Metachandini. It was described by Edward Meyrick in 1910. Its type locality is in Assam.

References

Oecophorinae
Moths described in 1910
Taxa named by Edward Meyrick
Moths of Asia